Kay Island is a small island lying  east of Cape Johnson in the northern part of Wood Bay, Victoria Land, Antarctica. It was discovered in 1841 by Captain James Clark Ross, Royal Navy, and named by him for Lieutenant Joseph W. Kay, Director of the Rossbank Observatory in Tasmania, who was third lieutenant on the ship Terror. Originally charted by Ross as a group of three islands, only this one is now known to exist.

See also 
 List of antarctic and sub-antarctic islands

References

Islands of Victoria Land
Borchgrevink Coast